Bagnall Road Wood is a local nature reserve near Milton, on the eastern fringe of Stoke-on-Trent, England.

History and description
The site was a tree nursery in the 19th century. There are mostly deciduous trees, including beech, hornbeam and oak. Less common trees include black poplar.

The wood, of area , was designated a local nature reserve (LNR) in 2004. It is owned and managed by Stoke-on-Trent City Council.

References

Local nature reserves in Staffordshire
Forests and woodlands of Staffordshire